Coeloptera is a genus of moths belonging to the subfamily Tortricinae of the family Tortricidae.

Species
Coeloptera epiloma (Lower, 1902)
Coeloptera gyrobathra (Turner, 1925)
Coeloptera vulpina (Turner, 1916)

See also
List of Tortricidae genera

References

External links
tortricidae.com

Archipini
Tortricidae genera
Taxa named by Alfred Jefferis Turner